Dorcadion abakumovi is a species of beetle in the family Cerambycidae. It was described by Thomson in 1864.

Subspecies
 Dorcadion abakumovi abakumovi Thomson, 1864
 Dorcadion abakumovi laterale Jakovlev, 1895
 Dorcadion abakumovi lepsyense Danilevsky, 2004
 Dorcadion abakumovi lukhtanovi Danilevsky, 1996
 Dorcadion abakumovi sarkandicum Danilevsky, 2004
 Dorcadion abakumovi takyr Danilevsky, 1996

See also 
Dorcadion

References

abakumovi
Beetles described in 1864